Sinaga is a Batak surname. It may refer to:

 Anicetus Bongsu Antonius Sinaga (born 1941), Indonesian Roman Catholic bishop 
 Ferdinand Sinaga (born 1988), Indonesian footballer 
 Hadrianus Sinaga (1912–1981), Indonesian politician and government minister
 Mangaradja Sinaga (1924–2000), Indonesian colonel and politician 
 Reynhard Sinaga (born 1983), Indonesian serial rapist 
 Saktiawan Sinaga (born 1982), Indonesian footballer

See also
Porela, synonym of Sinaga, a genus of moths

Batak